Grabe can refer to:

 Surname Grabe, also spelled Graebe or Gräbe:
 Carl Gräbe (1841-1927), German chemist
 Hermann Friedrich Graebe (1900–1986), German engineer
 John Ernest Grabe (1666–1711), English theologian
 Matt Grabe (born 1985), American record producer
 Ronald J. Grabe (born 1945), American astronaut
 Vera Grabe, Colombian anthropologist
 Grabe, Apače, a village in Slovenia
 Grabe, Mühlhausen, a quarter of Mühlhausen in Thuringia, Germany
 Grabe, Središče ob Dravi, a village in Slovenia
 Grabe, Croatia, a village near Bedekovčina, Croatia

Grabe also means to be surprised and/or fascinated by an expression used in WhatsApp communication in Malaysia